Incilius majordomus, also known as the Chief's toad, is a species of frog in the family Bufonidae. It has not been seen since 1980, and is believed to be possibly extinct.

Taxonomy

The species was first described in 2013. Its specific epithet comes from the Latin phrase majordomus and honors the herpetologist Charles W. Myers.

Description

Incilius majordomus is a moderately sized toad, with males reaching 78mm in length and females growing up to 91mm. Males and females also differ in coloration; males are a bright yellow and females are duller shades of tan and brown.

References

Incilius
Amphibians of Panama
Endemic fauna of Panama
Amphibians described in 2013